General Lage Gustaf Harald Thunberg (22 March 1905 – 28 September 1997) was a Swedish Air Force officer. He was the Chief of the Air Force from 1961 to 1968.

Early life
Thunberg was born on 22 March 1905 in Mörlunda, Sweden, the son of master builder August Andersson and his wife Adéle (née Thunberg).

Career
Thunberg was commissioned as an officer with the rank of second lieutenant and assigned to Kalmar Regiment (I 21) in 1927 and was transferred to the Swedish Air Force in 1933. Thunberg won the Nordic flying competition Nordisk flygarpokal in 1934 and 1936. He was promoted to captain in 1937 and was head of the Royal Swedish Air Force College (Flygvapnets kadettskola) from 1939 to 1943. He was promoted to major in 1942 and to lieutenant colonel in 1944. Thunberg was commanding officer of the Bråvalla Wing (F 13) from 1944 to 1947 (acting in 1943) and was promoted to colonel in the Swedish Air Force the same year.

In 1947 he was transferred to the Royal Swedish Air Force Materiel Administration. There Thunberg was head of the Equipment Office from 1947 to 1949, of the Aircraft Office from 1949 to 1950, of the Materiel Department from 1950 to 1954 and of the Aircraft Department from 1954 to 1957. He was promoted to major general in 1957 and was then commanding officer of the Third Air Group (Tredje flygeskadern, E 3) from 1958 to 1960 and vice chief of the Royal Swedish Air Force Materiel Administration from 1960 to 1961. Thunberg was promoted to lieutenant general in 1961 and was appointed Chief of the Air Force. He retired from the military in 1968 and was promoted to full general. Thunberg then served as War Materials Inspector and head of the National Swedish War Materials Inspectorate from 1968 and 1977.

Personal life
In 1935 he married Birgit Bergström (born 1905), the daughter of factory manager Edvin Bergström and Fanny (née Gihl). Thunberg died on 28 September 1977 and was buried at Galärvarvskyrkogården in Stockholm.

Dates of rank
1926 – Second lieutenant
1929 – Lieutenant
1937 – Captain
1942 – Major
1944 – Lieutenant colonel
1947 – Colonel
1957 – Major general
1961 – Lieutenant general
1968 – General

Awards and decorations

Swedish
   Commander Grand Cross of the Order of the Sword (6 June 1963)
  Knight of the Order of the Polar Star
  Knight of the Order of Vasa

Foreign
  1st Class / Knight Grand Cross of the Order of Merit of the Italian Republic (13 April 1966)
  Grand Cross of the Order of St. Olav (1 July 1967)
  Grand Officer of the Order of Orange-Nassau with Swords
 Legion of Merit (6 April 1962)

Honours
Member of the Royal Swedish Academy of War Sciences (1954)
President of the Royal Swedish Academy of War Sciences (1965–1967)

References

1905 births
1997 deaths
Swedish Air Force generals
People from Hultsfred Municipality
Members of the Royal Swedish Academy of War Sciences
Commanders Grand Cross of the Order of the Sword
Knights of the Order of the Polar Star
Knights of the Order of Vasa
Foreign recipients of the Legion of Merit
Burials at Galärvarvskyrkogården